Qurbani Rang Layegi is a 1991 Indian Hindi-language drama film directed by Raj N. Sippy and produced by K. K. Talwar. It stars Sanjay Dutt, Poonam Dhillon, Padmini Kolhapure in pivotal roles, along with Kajal Kiran and Shakti Kapoor. The film was started making in 1984, due to dalays for many reasons, it was finally released in 1991.

Cast
 Sanjay Dutt as Raj 
 Poonam Dhillon as Poonam
 Padmini Kolhapure as Basanti
 Kajal Kiran as Chhutki 
 Shakti Kapoor as Vicky
 Sujit Kumar as Jaikishan

Soundtrack
Lyrics: Gulshan Bawra

References

External links

1990s Hindi-language films
1991 films
Films scored by Laxmikant–Pyarelal
Films directed by Raj N. Sippy